Immanuel Christian School is an independent school located at 215 Rougeau Ave in Winnipeg, Manitoba, Canada. It was founded in 1976 by members of the Canadian Reformed Church, a Christian church. It has a Kindergarten to Grade 12 program and serves over 200 children. The sports team are fairly accomplished; they participate in Manitoba's Zone 12 Athletic Division.

Team sports
Immanuel Christian School takes part in several sports including cross country, volleyball, basketball, badminton, soccer, and track. They participate in Manitoba's Zone 12 Athletic Division.

Mission statement
The purpose of our school is to assist parents in their God-given duty to instruct their children in the fear of the Lord.

School Facilities
The school has its own campus with standard facilities including a library, a computer lab, a music room, and a resource room. These are located on the two levels of the main building. A gymnasium has been added to accommodate the growing number of students and the expansion of the program.
The school does not provide bussing, nor does it have a cafeteria.

References

External links 
 School home page

Immanuel Christian School
Immanuel Christian School
Christian schools in Manitoba
Educational institutions established in 1976
1976 establishments in Manitoba

Saint Boniface, Winnipeg
Transcona, Winnipeg